Yeshwantrao Chavan College of Engineering is an autonomous engineering college affiliated to RTMNU (formerly, Nagpur University). It is located in town of Hingna in the district of Nagpur. The college was established in 1984 and is named after Yashwantrao Chavan, former first Chief Minister of Maharashtra State and the former Deputy Prime Minister of India; since then, it has been under the administration of Nagar Yuwak Shikshan Sanstha, a subsidiary of Meghe Group. It attained its autonomous status from the University Grants Commission (India) in 2010. The college offers engineering degrees at undergraduate, postgraduate and doctoral level.

Departments 
Since the institution was established, eight departments for higher study and research have been created.

College events

YASH
The institute organizes an annual cultural and technical event known as "YASH". It is a week-long event where various events and competitions take place, such as Freshers Day, Fashion Show-Fashionista, rock concerts, celebrity shows, Ethnic Day and Rose Day, Megheshri .

Compufest
Compufest is an annual event conducted by the Department of Computer Technology. It is a two-day, techno-cultural event with inter-college and intra-college competitions and workshops.

Electrrica
Electrrica is the annual technical festival conducted by the Department of Electrical Engineering. It is a two-day event of technical workshops, competitions, seminars, guest lectures and various other related events.

YCCE-Siemens Center of Excellence for Digital Manufacturing and Robotics

Under the guidance and direction of Siemens and AICTE, the YCCE-Siemens Center of Excellence for Digital Manufacturing and Robotics was established. The establishment was inaugurated in December 2013 by Hon. Dr. A.P.J Abdul Kalam, the 11th President of India.

Notable alumni

Sonu Sood - an Indian actor, film producer, model, humanitarian, and philanthropist who works predominantly in Hindi, Telugu, and Tamil films.
Shishir Parkhie - A widely acclaimed Indian Ghazal singer, composer and live performer.

NAAC Grade
National Assessment and Accreditation Council (NAAC) Grade - A++ (3.6/4) (highest among engineering colleges in Maharashtra) in 2022.

NIRF Rankings

National Institutional Ranking Framework (NIRF) rank - 149 (among engineering colleges) in 2021.

National Institutional Ranking Framework (NIRF) rank - 139 (among engineering colleges) in 2020.

National Institutional Ranking Framework (NIRF) rank - 134 (among engineering colleges) in 2019.

National Institutional Ranking Framework (NIRF) rank-band: 101-150 (among engineering colleges) in 2018.

National Institutional Ranking Framework (NIRF) rank-band: 101-150 (among engineering colleges) in 2017.

National Institutional Ranking Framework (NIRF) rank - 93 (among engineering colleges) in 2016.

References

External links 
 Website: Official website

Engineering colleges in Nagpur
Rashtrasant Tukadoji Maharaj Nagpur University